Qeshlaq-e Qarah Jalu Hajji Iman (also Romanized as Qeshlāq-e Qarah Jālū Ḩājjī Īmān) is a village in Qeshlaq-e Sharqi Rural District, Qeshlaq Dasht District, Bileh Savar County, Ardabil Province, Iran. At the 2006 census, its population was 145, in 38 families.

References 

Populated places in Bileh Savar County
Towns and villages in Bileh Savar County